Rashid Abdulrahman Al Hosani (born 20 October 1975) is an Emirati former footballer who played as a centre-back for the United Arab Emirates national football team.

External links

1975 births
Living people
Emirati footballers
Emirati expatriate footballers
Al-Shaab CSC players
Yverdon-Sport FC players
Al Jazira Club players
Ajman Club players
2004 AFC Asian Cup players
2007 AFC Asian Cup players
United Arab Emirates international footballers
UAE Pro League players
Association football defenders
Expatriate footballers in Switzerland
Emirati expatriate sportspeople in Switzerland